This article gives an overview of socialism in the Netherlands, including communism and social democracy. It is limited to communist, socialist, social democratic, and democratic socialist parties with substantial support, mainly proved by having had a representation in parliament. The sign ⇒ means a reference to another party in that scheme.

Overview
Socialism came relatively late to the Netherlands, because of its slow industrialization. In the 1860s a socialist movement began to develop. Although the socialists were aided by the foundation of the First International and of the first Dutch trade unions, united in the Algemeen Nederlands Werklieden Vereniging, a socialist party was not founded until 1881, when the Social Democratic League was founded. The slow industrialization was reflected in the support base of the first socialist parties. It wasn't the urban proletariat which supported them most, instead it were agricultural workers, who were the first to support the League.

Before the First World War, the socialist movement saw two major splits: in 1894 between revolutionary anarchists and parliament-oriented socialists. The latter left the League to found the Social-Democratic Workers' Party, while the former kept control of the SDB, which was soon banned by the government. The second split was between a revolutionary Marxist opposition and a reformist-revisionist establishment. In 1907 the opposition group left the SDAP to found the Social-Democratic Party, which would become the Communist Party of the Netherlands (CPN) after the Russian Revolution. This was one of the first splits between reformists and revolutionaries within the European labour movement. Both the revolutionaries and the reformists have their own labour unions, the reformist Nederlands Verbond van Vakverenigingen and the anarcho-syndicalist Nationaal Arbeidssecretariaat. At the end of the First World War, a brief and very unsuccessful attempt at revolution occurred during the Red Week.

After the Second World War, the SDAP merged with smaller left-liberal, progressive catholic and Protestant groups and parties to form the Labour Party (PvdA). The founders hoped that the old social structures would be replaced by a united progressive Netherlands, the Breakthrough. However, the Labour Party quickly found itself taking the SDAP's old place in the socialist pillar. It only gained only a third of the seats in the 1946 elections. From 1946 and 1958, PvdA leader Willem Drees served as prime minister of a broad coalition. The PvdA became social-democratic supporting a welfare state, a mixed economy, decolonization and NATO. In 1946 the CPN performed particularly well as it had gained support due to the role played by communists in the Dutch Resistance.

During the 1960s and 1970s socialism was invigorated with the development of New Left-movements. In 1957 the Pacifist Socialist Party was founded out of the developing peace movement and provided an alternative to the pro-American PvdA and the pro-Soviet CPN. In 1967 the Nieuw Links, a group of young socialists within the PvdA gained control of the party and set out on a new course, which included both social-democratic and New Left ideals, such as a strong welfare state, women's liberation, environmental protection and international development. They wanted to form a progressive majority-coalition, together with their left-liberal and progressive Christian allies. A group of social-democrats leave the PvdA to form DS'70. The PvdA and their allies were unsuccessful at gaining a majority however in the 1971 and 1972 elections and the PvdA's leader Joop den Uyl was forced to form a tenuous coalition with the Christian democrats.

During the 1980s socialism, communism and social-democracy were forced into a defensive position. The smaller socialist parties, PSP and CPN, which prospered in the 1960s and 1970s, lost seats, whilst the CPN disappeared from the House of Representatives in the 1986. The PvdA was confined to opposition, while the liberals and Christian democrats reformed the welfare state. The socialist labour union lost members and merged with the Catholic labour union to form the Federatie Nederlandse Vakbeweging.

In the 1990s socialists and social-democrats renewed themselves. In 1989 the PSP and CPN merged with two small Christian left parties (the Evangelical People's Party and the Political Party of Radicals) to form GreenLeft. In the 1994 general election Wim Kok, the new leader of the PvdA, lost a considerable number of seats, but still emerged as leader of the largest party. He forms an unprecedented purple coalition with progressive and conservative liberals which implements a Third Way policy, including privatisation of public companies, legalisation of prostitution and euthanasia and some institutional reforms. In 1994 a small formerly Maoist party, the Socialist Party (SP) also entered parliament.

In 2007 the PvdA re-enters the coalition, now with Christian-democrats and the economically left-leaning but socially conservative ChristianUnion. The SP won an unprecedented 25 seats in the 2006 elections. Since 2004, GreenLeft has radically renewed its image and is now promoting itself as a left-liberal party, breaking with its socialist roots.

Timeline

SDB
1881 The Social Democratic League (Dutch: Sociaal Democratische Bond; SDB) is founded.
1893 Moderate faction leaves the SDB to found the ⇒Social-Democratic Workers' Party. The SDB is consequently forbidden but continues as the secret Socialist League.
1900 The last members of the Socialist League join the ⇒SDAP.

SDAP
1894 Social-Democratic Workers' Party (Dutch: Sociaal Democratische Arbeiderspartij; SDAP) is founded by a group known as the Twelve apostles, including Pieter Jelles Troelstra.
1907 A group of revolutionary Marxists are removed from party ranks and found the ⇒SDP.
1932 A group of orthodox Marxists led by Jacques de Kadt leave the SDAP to found the Independent Socialist Party (Dutch: Onafhankelijk Socialistische Partij; OSP), which in 1935 would merge with the ⇒RSP.
1941 The SDAP is banned by the German occupying force.
1946 The SDAP merges into the ⇒Labour Party.

CPN
1907 A group of revolutionary Marxists are removed from SDAP party ranks and found the Social Democratic Party (Dutch: Sociaal-Democratische Partij; SDP).
1918 The SDP form a common parliamentary party with BCS and SP.
1918 The SDP changes its name to Communist Party Holland (Dutch: Communistische Partij Holland; CPH) to conform to Comintern rules.
1937 The CPH changes its name to Communist Party of the Netherlands (Dutch: Communistische Partij Nederland; CPN) to increase international clarity.
1941 The CPN is forbidden by the German occupying force and goes into illegal resistance.
1958 The moderate Bruggroep leaves the CPN to found the Socialist Workers' Party, in 1963 it joins the PSP.
1964 A Maoist group is removed from the party ranks. They form the Communist Unity Movement of the Netherlands (marxist-leninist), which would become the SP
1983 The orthodox communist League of Communists in the Netherlands leaves the CPN. In 1992 they would become the New Communist Party of the Netherlands.
1989 The CPN joins the GreenLeft together with the ⇒PSP, Political Party of Radicals and the Evangelical People's Party.

BCS
1907 The League of Christian Socialists (Dutch: Bond Christen Socialisten; BCS) is founded.
1918 The BCS form a common parliamentary party with SDP and SP.
1919 The BCS splits, some members leave to join the Communist Party of the Netherlands, others join the Social Democratic Workers' Party and others remain independent and form the Christian Democratic Union with the Christian Socialist Party and former members of the Christian Democratic Party in 1926.

SP (Interwar)
1918 The Socialist Party (Dutch: Socialistische Partij; SP) is founded by members of the syndicalist union, Nationaal Arbeidssecretariaat.
1918 The SDP form a common parliamentary party with BCS and SDP.
1928 The SP dissolves, many of its members would join the ⇒RSP.

RSP
1929 The Revolutionary Socialist Party (Dutch: Revolutionair Socialistische Partij; RSP) is founded by Henk Sneevliet, a former member of the ⇒CPH.
1935 The Independent Socialist Party, a split from the ⇒SDAP in 1932, led Jacques de Kadt merges with the RSP to form the Revolutionary Socialist Workers' Party (Dutch: Revolutionair Socialistische Arbeidersparty; RSAP).
1941 The RSP is forbidden by the German occupying force and forms the illegal resistance group Marx-Lenin-Luxemburg Front.

PvdA
1946 The Labour Party (Dutch: Partij van de Arbeid; PvdA) is by ⇒SDAP the Christian Democratic Union, the Freethinking Democratic League and several resistance groups
1948 A small group of former Freethinking Democrats leaves the PvdA to join the People's Party for Freedom and Democracy
1970 A group of conservative social-democrats leaves the PvdA to found ⇒DS70.
2014 Two members of parliament resign from the party and form ⇒DENK.

PSP
1957 The Pacifist Socialist Party (Dutch: Pacifistisch Socialistische Partij) is founded by a group of politically homeless, former members of the ⇒PvdA and ⇒CPN and people involved in the peace movement.
1974 A Trotskyist group leaves the PSP to found the League of International Communists, which would become Socialist Alternative Politics.
1985 A group who opposes further cooperation with ⇒CPN and the Political Party of Radicals, led by MP Fred van der Spek leaves the party to found the Party for Socialism and Disarmament, which would become the Pacifist Socialist Party '92.
1989 The PSP joins the GreenLeft together with the ⇒CPN, Political Party of Radicals and the Evangelical People's Party.

DS70
1970 Democratic Socialists 1970 (Dutch: Democratisch Socialisten '70; DS70) is founded by a group of former members of the ⇒PvdA.
1983 DS70 is officially dissolved, many of its members return to the ⇒PvdA.

SP
1971 The Communist Party of the Netherlands/Marxist-Leninist (Dutch: Kommunistiese Partij Nederland/Marxisties-Leninisties, KPN/ML) splits from the Communist Unity Movement of the Netherlands (marxist-leninist), which had split from the CPN
1972 The KPN/ML renames itself Socialist Party (Dutch: Socialistiese Partij; SP)
1993 The SP renames itself Socialist Party (Dutch: Socialistische Partij; SP)

GroenLinks
1989 GroenLinks (English: GreenLeft) is formed by the ⇒PSP, the ⇒CPN, the green Political Party of Radicals and the Christian left Evangelical People's Party. Although formed by a communist and a socialist party, Groenlinks lacks a specific socialist, communist or social-democratic profile and can better be classified as a green party.

DENK 

2014 DENK is formed by members of ⇒PvdA after disagreements about the party's proposals for monitoring Turkish Islamist organisations.
2017 DENK becomes the first Dutch party advocating the interest of citizens with a migrant background to win seats in parliament.

BIJ1 

2016 ⇒DENK member Sylvana Simons leaves the party after disputes about the party's conservative positions and lack of support for her after receiving death threats. She founds a new party under the name "Article1", making reference to the first article in the Dutch constitution, that prohibits discrimination.
2017 Article1 does not win any seats in the parliamentary elections and is forced to change its name to BIJ1 after complaints about copyright infringement regarding the party's name.
2018 BIJ1 gains parliamentary representation by winning a seat in the municipal council of Amsterdam.
2021 BIJ1 wins a seat in parliamentary elections with a far-left election programme.

Socialist leaders
Social-Democratic League: Ferdinand Domela Nieuwenhuis
Social-Democratic Workers' Party: Pieter Jelles Troelstra
Communist Party of the Netherlands: Paul de Groot
Revolutionary Socialist Party: Henk Sneevliet
Labour Party: Willem Drees, Joop den Uyl, Wim Kok, Wouter Bos, Job Cohen, Diederik Samsom, Lodewijk Asscher, Lilianne Ploumen
Socialist Party: Jan Marijnissen, Agnes Kant, Emile Roemer, Lilian Marijnissen (current)
DENK: Tunahan Kuzu, Farid Azarkan (current)
BIJ1: Sylvana Simons (current)

Socialist thinkers
Influential Dutch socialist thinkers include:
Anton Pannekoek, council communist theorist.
Jacques de Kadt, Marxist, anti-stalinist and social-democrat

See also
 History of the Netherlands
 Politics of the Netherlands
 List of political parties in the Netherlands
 Anarchism in the Netherlands
 Liberalism in the Netherlands
 Christian democracy in the Netherlands
 Trade unions in the Netherlands

 
Political history of the Netherlands
History of socialism
Netherlands